Paratrophon patens is a species of sea snail, a marine gastropod mollusk in the family Muricidae, the murex snails or rock snails.

Description
The length of the shell attains 20.8 mm.

Distribution
This marine species is endemic to New Zealand

References

 Hombron J. B. & Jacquinot H. (1848 [March]). Atlas d'Histoire Naturelle. Zoologie par MM. Hombron et Jacquinot, chirurgiens de l'expédition. in: Voyage au pole sud et dans l'Océanie sur les corvettes l'Astrolabe et la Zélée pendant les années 1837-1838-1839-1840 sous le commandement de M. Dumont-D'Urville capitaine de vaisseau publié sous les auspices du département de la marine et sous la direction supérieure de M. Jacquinot, capitaine de Vaisseau, commandant de La Zélée. Vingt-quatriéme livraison. Insectes lépidoptéres pls 1,2; Mollusques pls 9, 11, 12.
In: Voyage au Pôle Sud et dans l'Océanie sur les corvettes l'Astrolabe et la Zélée, Zoologie, vol. 5, p. 1-118, 125-131 (Mollusques); 119-124, 131-132 (Zoophytes)
 Spencer, H.G., Marshall, B.A. & Willan, R.C. (2009). Checklist of New Zealand living Mollusca. Pp 196-219. in: Gordon, D.P. (ed.) New Zealand inventory of biodiversity. Volume one. Kingdom Animalia: Radiata, Lophotrochozoa, Deuterostomia. Canterbury University Press, Christchurch
 Maxwell, P.A. (2009). Cenozoic Mollusca. Pp 232-254 in Gordon, D.P. (ed.) New Zealand inventory of biodiversity. Volume one. Kingdom Animalia: Radiata, Lophotrochozoa, Deuterostomia. Canterbury University Press, Christchurch.

Muricidae
Gastropods of New Zealand
Gastropods described in 1854